Sphaenothecus is a genus of beetles in the family Cerambycidae, containing the following species:

 Sphaenothecus argenteus Bates, 1880
 Sphaenothecus bilineatus (Gory, 1831)
 Sphaenothecus facetus Chemsak & Noguera, 1998
 Sphaenothecus maccartyi Chemsak & Noguera, 1998
 Sphaenothecus picticornis Bates, 1880
 Sphaenothecus toledoi Chemsak & Noguera, 1998
 Sphaenothecus trilineatus Dupont, 1838

References

Trachyderini
Cerambycidae genera